Emma Hagieva (born April 26, 1989 in Kizlyar) is a former Russian figure skater who competes internationally for Azerbaijan. She is the 2005 Azerbaijani national silver medalist. She lives and trains in Moscow and
currently working on the Sport FM radio station as a presenter and a reporter. 
She is the hostess of the morning program with her colleagues Roman Vagin and Alexander Boyarskiy.
Hagieva is ethnically Azerbaijani.

Programs

Competitive highlights

 J = Junior level; QR = Qualifying Round

Personal life
Emma is a polyglot. She is fluent in English, Spanish and Azerbaijani.

She supports Real Madrid. Her favorite player is Sergio Ramos.

In her spare time Emma likes to travel and to cook cupcakes and pastries.

She Regularly takes part in various demonstration events.

References

External links

 

1989 births
Living people
People from Kizlyar
Citizens of Azerbaijan through descent
Azerbaijani figure skaters
Russian people of Azerbaijani descent
Russian sportspeople of Azerbaijani descent
Sportspeople from Dagestan